List of The Mighty Boosh characters may refer to:

List of recurring The Mighty Boosh characters
List of minor The Mighty Boosh characters